Joseph Hall Jackson (June 11, 1787 – January 7, 1856) was an American lawyer and politician from New York.

Life 
Jackson was born on June 11, 1787 in New Durham, New Hampshire. He attended Dartmouth College, graduating from there in 1807.

In 1808, Jackson taught in Danvers, Massachusetts. Shortly afterwards, he read law in New York City for three years. He was admitted to the bar in 1811 and initially practiced in Durham, New York. He later started practicing in Albany. In 1833, he moved to Malone. 

In 1841, Jackson was appointed District Attorney of Franklin County. He served in the New York State Assembly in 1843. In the 1844 New York state election, he was the Whig Party candidate for Canal Commissioner.

For a time, Jackson worked as a newspaper editor and contributor for the Northern Spectator after its previous editor George P. Allen retired. In 1844, he formed a law partnership with A. B. Parmelee, which lasted for two years. He later created a law firm with John Hutton. The firm later included Albert Hobbs.

Jackson married Elizabeth Gillette in 1829. Their daughter, Elizabeth L., married Judge Horace A. Taylor. He was a vestryman in the local Episcopal Church. 

Jackson died in Malone on January 7, 1856.

References

External links 

 The Political Graveyard

1787 births
1856 deaths
People from New Durham, New Hampshire
Dartmouth College alumni
People from Malone, New York
County district attorneys in New York (state)
19th-century American politicians
New York (state) Whigs
Members of the New York State Assembly
19th-century American Episcopalians